Azure Capital Partners, which was established in 2000, is an early stage venture capital firm that invests in the information technology industry using an investment research approach to venture capital investing. Azure Capital Partners was founded by Mike Kwatinetz, Paul Ferris, Paul Weinstein, and Cameron Lester.

The firm's portfolio includes TopTier, VMware, World Wide Packets, and VAPPS and more recently, BlogHer, BroadLight, Calix, Chairish, Cooking.com, Convercent, Coraid, Cyan Optics, Education.com, ezRez Software (Switchfly), Fonality, K2 (SourceCode), Knowledge Adventure, Medsphere, NeoNova, Phanfare, PSS Systems, Rooftop Comedy, SilkRoad Tech, SlideRocket, The Bouqs, TravelMuse, TripIt, and Zend Technologies.

In October 2008, the company sold Bill Me Later to eBay for $945 million. In 2009, Azure Capital was listed as one of the top 100 global venture capital firms in the Red Herring magazine.

Management 

 Paul Ferris, Mike Kwatinetz and Paul Weinstein - Founders

 Andrea Drager - Principal

 Lisa McNamara - Chief Financial Officer

 Dan Park - CEO of Toronto-based clutch

See also 
 List of venture capital firms
 Operating partner

References

External links 
 Company Website

Private equity firms of the United States
Venture capital firms of the United States
Financial services companies based in California
Companies based in San Francisco
Financial services companies established in 2000
2000 establishments in California